Tsujigiri ( or , literally "crossroads killing") is a Japanese term for a practice when a samurai, after receiving a new katana or developing a new fighting style or weapon, tests its effectiveness by attacking a human opponent, usually a random defenseless passer-by, in many cases during nighttime. The practitioners themselves are also referred to as tsujigiri.

Variations
Sword attacks were not the only possible application of this act. In a variation named tsuji-nage ("crossroads throwing"), the samurai would attack the passerby with jujutsu in order to test his own techniques or indulge in alive practice. This must not be mistaken with tsuji-zumo, unsanctioned sumo bouts hosted in the street between willing participants.

History
In the medieval era, the term referred to traditional duels between samurai, but in the Sengoku period (1467–1600), widespread lawlessness caused it to degrade into indiscriminate murder, permitted by the unchecked power of the samurai. Shortly after order was restored, the Edo government prohibited the practice in 1602. Offenders would receive capital punishment.

1696 spree killing

The only known incident in which a very large number of people were indiscriminately killed in the Edo period was the 1696 Yoshiwara spree killing (Yoshiwara hyakunin giri; lit. "Yoshiwara Hundred People Slashing"), when a wealthy lord, Sano Jirōzaemon, had a psychotic fit and murdered dozens of prostitutes with a katana in Yoshiwara, the red-light district of Edo (modern-day Tokyo). Despite his class and heritage, he was treated by authorities as a spree killer and was later sentenced to death and executed. Later, a kabuki play was made about the incident, which inspired the 1960 movie adaptation Hero of the Red-Light District.

Mary Midgley's "Trying Out One's New Sword" 
The British philosopher Mary Midgley wrote an essay attacking cultural relativism and moral relativism in 1981. In "Trying Out One's New Sword", she discusses tsujigiri as an example of an abominable practice that should be condemned, with no need to be part of the culture that might create it.  The professor of Japanese history Jordan Sand criticized Midgley for misrepresenting the practices of ancient Japan by indicating that tsujigiri was never condoned, and it is not even clear it happened with any frequency. Sand believes that any samurai who did so was both rare and would be considered insane by the culture of the era and that Midgley erred in presenting it had been an accepted practice.

See also
Crypteia
Kiri-sute gomen
Tameshigiri
The Dull Sword

References

Japanese martial arts terminology
Edo period